An election of Members of the European Parliament representing Netherlands constituency for the 1994–1999 term of the European Parliament was held on 9 June 1994. It was part of the wider 1994 European election. Eleven parties competed in a D'Hondt type election for 31 seats. (up from 25).

Background

Combined lists
Several parties combined in one list to take part in this European Election and increase their chance on a seat in the European Parliament.
These combined lists are:
 SGP, RPF and GPV

Electoral alliances
No lists formed an electoral alliance.

Voting right
All subjects from other member states in the Netherlands were allowed to vote this election. It's no longer necessary that the member state of which the subject is from does the same.
Only for this election no ahead registration had to take place to take part.

These people got right to vote in this fifth election for the European Parliament in 1994 in the Netherlands:
 Everyone who was allowed to vote in the Dutch parliament elections;
 Dutch who are resident anywhere in the world and did not already have voting rights for the Dutch Parliament elections; (except for Dutch living in the Netherlands Antilles and Aruba, because they vote for the Estates of the Netherlands Antilles. Dutch from the Netherlands Antilles en Aruba are allowed to vote for European Elections if they lived for at least 10 years in the Netherlands.)
 Subjects of one of the other Member States which have residence in the Netherlands.

Numbering of the candidates list

Results

The liberal VVD and D66 parties and the orthodox Protestant alliance of Political Reformed Party, Reformatory Political Federation and Reformed Political Alliance profited from the expansion of the number of seats. While the Christian Democratic Appeal and the Labour Party lost a considerable number of votes, but remained stabile in seats. 35.69% of Dutch citizens turned out on election day.

European groups

| style="text-align:center;" colspan="11" | 
|-
|style="background-color:#E9E9E9;text-align:center;vertical-align:top;" colspan="3"|European group
!style="background-color:#E9E9E9" |Seats 1989
!style="background-color:#E9E9E9" |Seats 1994
!style="background-color:#E9E9E9" |Change
|-
| 
| style="text-align:left;" | European People's Party
| style="text-align:left;" | EPP
| style="text-align:right;" | 10
| style="text-align:right;" | 10
| style="text-align:right;" | 0 
|-
| style="background-color:gold;" width=0.3em|
| style="text-align:left;" | European Liberal Democrat and Reform Party
| style="text-align:left;" | ELDR
| style="text-align:right;" | 4
| style="text-align:right;" | 10
| style="text-align:right;" | 6 
|-
| 
| style="text-align:left;" | Party of European Socialists
| style="text-align:left;" | PES
| style="text-align:right;" | 8
| style="text-align:right;" | 8
| style="text-align:right;" | 0 
|-
| 
| style="text-align:left;" | Green Group in the European Parliament
| style="text-align:left;" | G/EFA
| style="text-align:right;" | 2
| style="text-align:right;" | 1
| style="text-align:right;" | 1 
|-
| 
| style="text-align:left;" | Europe of Nations
| style="text-align:left;" | EN
| style="text-align:right;" | 0
| style="text-align:right;" | 2
| style="text-align:right;" | 2 
|-
| 
| style="text-align:left;" | Non-Inscrits
| style="text-align:left;" | NI
| style="text-align:right;" | 1
| style="text-align:right;" | 0
| style="text-align:right;" | 1 
|-
|width="350" style="text-align:right;background-color:#E9E9E9" colspan="3"|
|width="30" style="text-align:right;background-color:#E9E9E9"| 25
|width="30" style="text-align:right;background-color:#E9E9E9"| 31
|width="30" style="text-align:right;background-color:#E9E9E9"| 6 
|}

Elected members 

Source:

Christian Democratic Appeal
Hanja Maij-Weggen (top candidate)
Peter Pex
Wim van Velzen
Bartho Pronk
Arie Oostlander
Jan Sonneveld
Karla Peijs
Ria Oomen-Ruijten
Jim Janssen van Raaij
Pam Cornelissen

Dutch Labour Party
Piet Dankert
Leonie van Bladel
Jan Marinus Wiersma
Frits Castricum
Hedy d'Ancona (top candidate)
Wim van Velzen
Maartje van Putten
Alman Metten

People's Party for Freedom and Democracy
Jessica Larive
Jan Mulder
Elly Plooij-van Gorsel
Gijs de Vries (top candidate)
Jan-Kees Wiebenga
Florus Wijsenbeek

Democrats 66
Johanna Boogerd-Quaak
Laurens Jan Brinkhorst
Doeke Eisma
Jan-Willem Bertens (top candidate)

SGP/RPF/GPV
Hans Blokland (GPV)
Leen van der Waal (SGP) (top candidate)

GreenLeft
Nel van Dijk (top candidate)

MEPs period 1994–1999
Below is a list of members of the European Parliament for the period 1994–1999 as a result of this election.

References 

Netherlands
1994
1994 elections in the Netherlands